A person's last words, their final articulated words stated prior to death or as death approaches, are often recorded because of the decedent's fame, but sometimes because of interest in the statement itself. (People dying of illness are frequently inarticulate at the end, and in such cases their actual last utterances may not be recorded or considered very important.) Last words may be recorded accurately, or, for a variety of reasons, may not. Reasons can include simple error or deliberate intent. Even if reported wrongly, putative last words can constitute an important part of the perceived historical records or demonstration of cultural attitudes toward death at the time.

Charles Darwin, for example, was reported to have disavowed his theory of evolution in favor of traditional religious faith at his death. This widely disseminated report served the interests of those who opposed Darwin's theory on religious grounds. However, the putative witness had not been at Darwin's deathbed or seen him at any time near the end of his life.

Both Eastern and Western cultural traditions ascribe special significance to words uttered at or near death, but the form and content of reported last words may depend on cultural context. There is a tradition in Hindu and Buddhist cultures of an expectation of a meaningful farewell statement; Zen monks by long custom are expected to compose a poem on the spot and recite it with their last breath. In Western culture particular attention has been paid to last words which demonstrate deathbed salvation – the repentance of sins and affirmation of faith.

Chronological list of last words
In rising chronological order, with death date specified. If relevant, also the context of the words or the circumstances of death are specified. If there is controversy or uncertainty concerning a person's last words, this is described in footnotes. For additional suicide notes, see Suicide note.

Pre-5th century

"Wash me well, hold me to your breast, protect me from the earth (lying against) your breast."
— Ḫattušili I, Hittite king (17th century BCE), probably addressing his wife or favorite concubine and expressing his fear of death while being gravely ill.

"Draw thy sword, and slay me, that men say not of me, A woman slew him."
()
— Abimelech, king of Shechem (12th century BCE). Mortally wounded in battle by a stone thrown by a woman, he asked his armor-bearer to kill him.

"Let me die with the Philistines."
()
— Samson, judge of the Israelites ( 1078 BCE), prior to bringing down pillars of the Philistine temple and killing 3000 people along with himself

"Draw thy sword, and thrust me through therewith; lest these uncircumcised come and thrust me through, and abuse me."
()
— Saul, king of Israel ( 1012 BCE), to his servant during the Battle of Mount Gilboa

"My reputation carried me safe through Greece, but the envy it excited at home has been my ruin."
— Anacharsis, Scythian philosopher (6th century BCE), mortally wounded with an arrow by his brother, King Caduidas

"You know that during the long time I have been in the world, I have said and done many things; upon mature reflection, I find nothing of which I have cause to repent, excepting a case which I will now submit to your decision, that I may know whether I have acted properly or not.
"On a certain occasion, I chanced to be one of three who sat in judgment on one of my own good friends, who, according to the laws, should have been punished with death. I was greatly embarrassed. One of two things was inevitable—either to violate the law or condemn my friend. After careful consideration, I devised this expedient. I delivered with such address all the most plausible arguments in behalf of the accused, that my two colleagues found no difficulty in acquitting him, and yet I, myself, condemned him to death without assigning any reason for my conduct. Thus I discharged two duties, those of friend and judge; yet I feel in my conscience something which makes me doubt whether my conduct was not criminal."
— Chilon of Sparta, philosopher (6th century BCE), speaking to his friends before his death

"It is better to perish here than to kill all these poor beans."
— Pythagoras, Ionian Greek philosopher and founder of Pythagoreanism (495 BCE), refusing to escape with his students from the Crotonians through a fava bean field

"All compounded things are subject to vanish. Strive with earnestness."
()
— Siddhārtha Gautama Buddha, Indian sage who founded Buddhism ( 483 BCE)

"Heaven has turned against me. No wise ruler arises, and no one in the Empire wishes to make me his teacher. The hour of my death has come."
— Confucius, Chinese philosopher who founded Confucianism (479 BCE)

"Can you turn rainy weather into dry?"
— Heraclitus, Greek philosopher ( 475 BCE), asking his physicians for relief from dropsy

"For, no Athenian, through my means, ever wore mourning."
— Pericles, Greek statesman (429 BCE), discussing with his friends what his greatest accomplishment had been

"Give the boys a holiday."
— Anaxagoras, Greek philosopher ( 428 BCE), in response to citizens of Lampsacus asking how they could honor his memory

"This to the fair Critias."
— Theramenes, Athenian statesman (404 BCE), after swallowing poison hemlock which he had been condemned to drink by Critias

"Crito, we owe a cock to Asclepius. Please, don't forget to pay the debt."
()
— Socrates, Greek philosopher (399 BCE), just before his death by ingestion of poison hemlock which he was forced to drink as a death sentence

"Men, it is good for me to die on this spot, where honor bids me; but for you, yonder your path lies. Hurry and save yourselves before the enemy can close with us."
— Anaxibius, Spartan admiral (388 BCE), before being killed in Athenian ambush

"Then I die happy."
— Epaminondas, Greek general and statesman of Thebes (362 BCE). He pulled out the weapon with which he had been impaled in battle once he heard the enemy was fleeing.

"But Alexander, whose kindness to my mother, my wife, and my children I hope the gods will recompense, will doubtless thank you for your humanity to me. Tell him, therefore, in token of my acknowledgement, I give him this right hand."
— Darius III, Achaemenid King of Kings of Persia (330 BCE), to a man who gave him water as he was dying

"How can the teeth of wild beasts hurt me, without consciousness?"
()
— Diogenes, Greek Cynic philosopher (323 BCE), asking for his body to be thrown outside the city wall for animals to eat

"To the strongest."
()
— Alexander the Great, conqueror and king of Macedonia ( 11 June 323 BCE), when asked to whom his vast empire should belong after his death

"Now, as soon as you please you may commence the part of Creon in the tragedy, and cast out this body of mine unburied. But, O gracious Neptune, I, for my part, while I am yet alive, arise up and depart out of this sacred place; though Antipater and the Macedonians have not left so much as thy temple unpolluted."
— Demosthenes, Greek statesman and orator (12 October 322 BCE), to Archias of Thurii; Demosthenes had taken poison to avoid arrest by Archias

"Ah! poor hump-back! thy many long years are at last conveying thee to the tomb; thou shalt soon see the palace of Pluto."
— Crates of Thebes, Cynic philosopher ( 285 BCE), surveying himself when about to die

"Now, farewell, and remember all my words!"
— Epicurus, Greek philosopher (270 BCE); the majority of his writings are now lost

"I come, I come, why dost thou call for me?"
— Zeno of Citium, Greek philosopher and founder of Stoicism ( 262 BCE), quoting Aeschylus' play Niobe and striking the ground with his hand after sustaining a minor injury, which he considered a sign that he was about to die. He then killed himself.

"Weep not, friend, for me, who dies innocent, by the lawless act of wicked men. My condition is much better than theirs."
— Agis IV, king of Sparta (241 BCE), prior to execution by strangulation

"O children, whither are you going?"
— Cratesiclea, queen of Sparta (219 BCE), after seeing the children of her family executed and prior to her own execution

"These, O Cephalon, are the wages of a king's love."
— Aratus of Sicyon, Hellenistic Greek politician and military commander (213 BCE), after expectorating blood while allegedly being slowly poisoned on the orders of Philip V of Macedon, his former friend

"Do not disturb my circles!"
()
— Archimedes, Greek mathematician ( 212 BCE), to a Roman soldier who interrupted his geometric experiments during the capture of Syracuse, whereupon the soldier killed him

"Go and give the ass a drink of wine to wash down the figs."
— Chrysippus, Greek philosopher ( 206 BCE), before dying of laughter

"It is well that we have not been every way unfortunate."
— Philopoemen, Greek general and statesman (183 BCE), sent a cup of poison to kill himself after being captured in battle. He asked the messenger with the poison about his cavalry and was told that most of them had escaped.

"Let us ease the Roman people of their continual care, who think it long to await the death of an old man."
()
— Hannibal, Carthaginian general ( 182 BCE)

"Let no one weep for me, or celebrate my funeral with mourning; for I still live, as I pass to and fro through the mouths of men."
— Ennius, writer and poet of the Roman Republic ( 169 BCE); lines dictated to be engraved on his memorial. Only fragments of his works now survive.

"It is a cold bath you give me."
— Jugurtha, king of Numidia (104 BCE), being lowered by the Romans into a damp dungeon to starve to death

"When will the republic find a citizen like me?"
— Marcus Livius Drusus, Roman politician and reformer (91 BCE), after being stabbed by unknown assassin

"Fear not true Pharisees, but greatly fear painted Pharisees."
— Alexander Jannaeus, king of Judea ( 76 BCE), to his wife

"O wretched head-band!—not able to help me even in this small thing!"
— Monime, wife of Mithridates VI (72/71 BCE), after failing to hang herself by her crown's strings in fulfillment of her death sentence

"I am not mistaken, surely, in believing you to have been formerly my fellow-soldier."
— Pompey, Roman general and statesman (28 September 48 BCE), to Lucius Septimius, one of his assassins

"You too, my child?"
()
— Julius Caesar, Roman dictator (15 March 44 BCE), discovering that his stepson Brutus was among his murderers

"O wretched virtue! thou art a bare name! I mistook thee for a substance; but thou thyself art the slave of fortune."
— Decimus Junius Brutus Albinus, Roman general and politician, conspirator in Julius Caesar's assassination (September 43 BCE), quoting from Euripides prior to execution

"I go no further: approach, veteran soldier, and, if you can at least do so much properly, sever this neck. [...] What would you have done had you come to me as your first victim?"
()
— Cicero, Roman statesman (7 December 43 BCE), facing an assassin sent by an enemy

"Through too much fondness of life, I have lived to endure the sight of my friend taken by the enemy before my face."
— Gaius Cassius Longinus, Roman senator and general, one of Julius Caesar's assassins (3 October 42 BCE), erroneously believing his comrade Titinius had been captured by Mark Antony's forces at the Battle of Philippi. Cassius then killed himself.

"Yes, indeed, we must fly; but not with our feet, but with our hands."
— Marcus Junius Brutus, Roman senator and assassin of Julius Caesar (23 October 42 BCE), after defeat at the Battle of Philippi. He then bade his friends farewell before killing himself.

"You must not pity me in this last turn of fate. You should rather be happy in the remembrance of our love, and in the recollection that of all men I was once the most famous and the most powerful, and now, at the end, have fallen not dishonorably, a Roman by a Roman vanquished."
— Mark Antony, Roman politician and general (1 August 30 BCE); to Cleopatra before his suicide

"Here thou art, then!"
()
— Cleopatra, pharaoh of Egypt (12 August 30 BCE), right before she reportedly committed suicide by letting an asp bite her

"Extremely well, and as became the descendant of so many kings."
— Charmion, servant to Cleopatra (12 August 30 BCE), when one of Emperor Augustus' men asked her, "Was this well done of your lady, Charmion?" She then fell dead.

"Death twitches my ear. 'Live,' he says. 'I am coming.'"
— Virgil, Roman poet (21 September 19 BCE)

"Have I played the part well? Then applaud, as I exit."
()
— Augustus, First Roman Emperor (19 August 14 CE)

"It is finished."
()
— Jesus, founder of Christianity ( 30 CE), right before his death by crucifixion

"Lord Jesus, receive my spirit. Lord, lay not this sin to their charge."
— Saint Stephen, early Christian deacon and protomartyr ( 34 CE), while being stoned to death

"I am still alive!"
— Caligula, Roman emperor (24 January 41 CE), after being fatally stabbed

"It is not painful, Pætus."
()
— Arria, Roman woman (42 CE), to her husband, Aulus Caecina Paetus. He had been condemned to death but given permission to kill himself; when he hesitated to do so, his wife stabbed herself first and handed the dagger to him.

"Strike here! Level your rage against the womb which gave birth to such a monster."
— Agrippina the Younger, mother of Nero (23 March 59 CE), to her murderer

"Asunder flies the man— / No single wound the gaping rupture seems, / Where trickling crimson flows the tender streams; / But from an opening horrible and wide / A thousand vessels pour the bursting tide: / At once the winding channel's course was broke, / Where wandering life her mazy journey took."
— Lucan, Roman poet (30 April 65 CE), forced to commit suicide after joining in a conspiracy against Nero. He died quoting lines from his own epic poem Pharsalia.

"Too late; is this your fidelity?"
()
— Nero, Roman emperor (9 June 68 CE), to a soldier trying to save him after his suicide

"Strike, if it be for the Romans' good."
()
— Galba, Roman emperor (15 January 69 CE), prior to beheading by supporters of Otho

"Go and show yourself to the soldiers, lest they cut you to pieces for being accessory to my death."
— Otho, Roman emperor (16 April 69 CE), to a freedman, prior to committing suicide

"Yet I was once your Emperor."
— Vitellius, Roman emperor (22 December 69 CE), prior to his killing on the Gemonian stairs

"Woe, I think I'm turning into a god... An emperor should die on his feet."
()
— Vespasian, Roman emperor (24 June 79 CE), ironically alluding to the Roman practice of posthumously deifying former emperors, before he collapsed and died when attempting to stand up

"My life is taken from me, though I have done nothing to deserve it; for there is no action of mine of which I should repent, but one."
— Titus, Roman emperor (13 September 81 CE)

"One!"
()
— Rabbi Akiva, Jewish scholar and sage (28 September 135 CE), concluding his recitation of the Shema Yisrael while being executed by the Romans

"O my poor soul, whither art thou going?"
— Hadrian, Roman emperor (10 July 138 CE)

"O Lord God Almighty, Father of Thy well-beloved Son, Jesus Christ, by whom we have received knowledge of Thee; God of angels, powers, and every creature that lives before Thee; I thank Thee that Thou hast graciously thought me worthy of this day and hour, that I may receive a portion in the number of Thy martyrs, and drink of Christ's cup, for the resurrection of both soul and body unto life eternal, in the incorruptibleness of the Holy Spirit. Among them may I be admitted this day, as an acceptable sacrifice, as Thou, O true and faithful God, hast prepared, foreshown, and accomplished. Wherefore, I praise Thee for all Thy mercies. I bless Thee. I glorify Thee, with Jesus Christ, Thy beloved Son, the Eternal, to Whom, with Thee and the Holy Spirit, be glory now and forever."
— Polycarp, Christian bishop of Smyrna (155 CE), prior to martyrdom by burning and spearing

"Equanimity."
()
— Antoninus Pius, Roman emperor (7 March 161 CE), giving the password for the night-watch

"You may go home, the show is over."
— Demonax, Greek Cynic philosopher (c. 170 CE)

"Go to the rising sun, for I am setting. Think more of death than of me."
— Marcus Aurelius, Roman emperor and philosopher (17 March 180 CE)

"Hurry, if anything remains for me to do."
()
— Septimius Severus, Roman emperor (4 February 211 CE)

"I am roasted,—now turn me, and eat me."
()
— Saint Lawrence, Christian deacon (10 August 258 CE), while being burned alive on a gridiron

"God be thanked."
— Cyprian, Christian bishop of Carthage and martyr (14 September 258 CE), sentenced to death by beheading

"I am making my last effort to return that which is divine in me to that which is divine in the Universe."
— Plotinus, Hellenistic philosopher (270 CE)

"And let my word be kept secret by you, so that no one knows the place but you alone. For in the resurrection of the dead I shall receive my body incorruptible once again from the Savior. Distribute my clothing. To Bishop Athanasius give the one sheepskin and the cloak on which I lie, which he gave to me new, but I have by now worn out. And to Bishop Serapion give the other sheepskin, and you keep the hair garment. And now God preserve you, children, for Antony is leaving and is with you no longer."
— Anthony the Great, Christian monk from Egypt (17 January 356 CE)

"How am I advanced, despising you that are upon the earth!"
— Marcus of Arethusa, Christian bishop and martyr (362 CE), hung up in a honey-smeared basket for bees to sting him to death

"And yet Thou hast conquered, O Galilean!"
()
— Julian, Roman emperor (26 June 363 CE), mortally wounded in battle. He had rejected Christianity in favor of paganism; according to some accounts, he was assassinated by a Christian.

"In peace I will sleep with Him and take my rest."
— Saint Monica, mother of Augustine of Hippo (387 CE)

"My dear one, with whom I lived in love so long, make room for me, for this is my grave, and in death we shall not be divided."
— Severus of Ravenna, Bishop of Ravenna ( 348 CE). According to a traditional story, Severus laid himself in his family tomb alongside his dead wife and daughter, then died.

"Old though he be, he is the best of all."
— Ambrose, Bishop of Milan (4 April 397 CE), when Simplician was mentioned as his possible successor

"What dost thou here, thou cruel beast?"
— Martin of Tours, third bishop of Tours (8 November 397 CE), to the Devil

5th to 14th centuries

"Glory to God for all things! Amen."
()
— John Chrysostom, Early Church Father and Archbishop of Constantinople (14 September 407), while traveling deeper into exile

"And me as I am going towards the God of mine, and I thank His name, as the Lord gave me everything bless His name. And I am telling you, to stand firm on your faith and to search for death for Christ for His name and you will find the permanent glory. I for my life glorified you and all of our race. And do not insult our home and do not abandon the love of the Greeks."
("მე ესე რა წარვალ წინაშე ღმრთისა ჩემისა, და ვმადლობ სახელსა მისსა, რამეთუ არა დამაკლო გამორჩეულთა წმიდათა მისთა. აწ გამცნებ თქუენ, რათა მტკიცედ სარწმუნოებასა ზედა სდგეთ და ეძიებდეთ ქრისტესთჳს სიკუდილსა სახელსა მისსა ზედა, რათა წარუვალი დიდება მოიგოთ. მე ჴორციელებრითა დიდებითა გადიდენ თქუენ ნათესავთა ჩემთა. და სახლსა ჩუენსა ნუ შეურაცხჰყოფთ, და სიყუარულსა ბერძენთასა ნუ დაუტეობთ".) 
— Vakhtang I, Georgian monarch (502/22), to his son Dachi.

"Here must I stop. What follows, let Baithen write."
— Columba, Irish abbot and missionary evangelist (8 June 597), ceasing to transcribe a Psalter

"Oh God, the Friend Most High!" or "The prayer, the prayer! And fear Allah with regard to those whom your right hands possess"
() or :()
— Muhammad, Prophet of God in Islam (8 June 632)

"My children, these fearful forests and these barren rocks shall be adorned with cities and temples, where the name of Jesus shall be openly adored. Ye shall abandon your precarious and hard chase, and assemble together under temples lofty as those pines, and graceful as the crown of the palm.
"Here shall my Saviour be known in all the simplicity of his doctrines. Ah! would that I might witness it; but I have seen those things in a vision. But I faint! I am weary! My earthly journey is finished! Receive my blessing. Go! and be kind one to another."
— Goar of Aquitaine, priest and hermit (6 July 649), dying in Oberwesel, Austrasia

"I desire that whatever merits I may have gained by good works may fall upon other people. May I be born again with them in the heaven of the blessed, be admitted to the family of Mi-le, and serve the Buddha of the future, who is full of kindness and affection. When I descend again upon earth, to pass through other forms of existence, I desire at every new birth to fulfill my duties toward Buddha, and arrive at the end to the highest perfect intelligence."
— Xuanzang, Chinese Buddhist monk, scholar, traveler and translator (5 February 664)

"You speak truth, all is finished now. Glory to God."
— Bede, English Benedictine monk (26 May 735); to a scribe to whom he was dictating a translation of the Gospel of John

"Lord, into Thy hands I commend my spirit."
— Charlemagne, European monarch (28 January 814), quoting Jesus

"Out! out!"
()
— Louis the Pious, King of the Franks (20 June 840), after turning his face to the wall before dying

"Thou my dear son, set thee now beside me, and I will deliver thee true instructions. My son, I feel that my hour is coming. My countenance is wan. My days are almost done. We must now part. I shall to another world, and thou shalt be left alone in all my wealth. I pray thee (for thou art my dear child) strive to be a father, and a lord to thy people. Be thou the children's father, and the widow's friend. Comfort thou the poor, and shelter the weak; and, with all thy might, right that which is wrong. And, son, govern thyself, by law; then shall the Lord love thee, and God above all things shall be thy reward. Call thou upon him to advise thee in all thy need, and so shall he help thee, the better to compass that which thou wouldest."
— Alfred the Great, king of the Anglo-Saxons (26 October 899), to his son, Edward the Elder

"I have now reigned above fifty years in victory or peace; beloved by my subjects, dreaded by my enemies, and respected by my allies. Riches and honors, power and pleasure, have waited on my call, nor does any earthly blessing appear to have been wanting to my felicity. In this situation, I have diligently numbered the days of pure and genuine happiness which have fallen to my lot: they amount to Fourteen:—O man! place not thy confidence in this present world!"
— Abd al-Rahman III, first Caliph of Córdoba (15 October 961)

"You urge me in vain. I am not the man to provide Christian flesh for pagan teeth to devour, and it would be so acting if I delivered unto you that which the poor have laid by for their subsistence."
()
— Ælfheah of Canterbury, Archbishop of Canterbury (19 April 1012), refusing to pay ransom before being killed by his Danish captors

"How shameful it is that I, who could not die in so many battles, should have been saved for the ignominious death of a cow! At least clothe me in my impenetrable breastplate, gird me with my sword, place my helmet on my head, my shield in my left hand, my gilded battle-axe in my right, that I, the bravest of soldiers, may die like a soldier."
— Siward, Earl of Northumbria (1055), dying of dysentery

"I have loved justice and hated iniquity; therefore I die in exile."
()
— Pope Gregory VII (25 May 1085), in exile in Salerno due to his conflicts with Henry IV, Holy Roman Emperor

"Then to our blessed Lady Mary, the mother of God, I commend myself. May she, by her holy intercessions, reconcile me to our Lord and Savior, Jesus Christ. God be merciful to—"
— William the Conqueror, King of England (9 September 1087), after hearing bell ringing Prime

"I shall not long hesitate between conscience and the Pope, for I shall soon appear in the presence of God, to be acquitted, I hope; to be condemned, I fear."
— Berengar of Tours, French Christian theologian (6 January 1088), dying in ascetic solitude on the island of Saint-Cosme near Tours

"Shoot, Walter, in the devil's name!"
— William II of England (2 August 1100), to Walter Tirel, who allegedly shot the king in a hunting accident

"Yes, if it be His will, I shall obey it willingly. But were He to let me stay with you a little longer till I have resolved a problem about the origin of the soul, I would gladly accept the boon; for I do not know whether anyone will work it out when I am gone. If I could but eat, I think I should pick up a little strength. I feel no pain in any part of my body; only I cannot retain nourishment, and that exhausts me."
— Anselm of Canterbury, Archbishop of Canterbury (21 April 1109)

"I wished to do more harm than I could."
()
— Ranulf Flambard, Norman Bishop of Durham and government minister (5 September 1128)

"I don't know."
()
— Peter Abelard, French philosopher and theologian (21 April 1142)

"May God's will be done."
— Bernard of Clairvaux, Burgundian abbot (20 August 1153), on being told he was dying

"In death at last let me rest with Abelard."
— Héloïse, French nun, philosopher, writer, scholar and abbess (16 May 1163–64?)

"For the name of Jesus and the protection of the church I am ready to embrace death."
— Thomas Becket, Archbishop of Canterbury (29 December 1170), to his murderers

"Lord, have mercy upon me. Wilt thou break a bruised reed?"
— Andronikos I Komnenos, Byzantine Emperor (12 September 1185), lynched by his former subjects

"Now let the world go as it will; I care for nothing more."
— Henry II of England (6 July 1189), on being told his son John was one of those conspiring against him

"When I am buried, carry my winding-sheet on the point of a spear, and say these words: Behold the spoils which Saladin carries with him! Of all his victories, realms, and riches, nothing remains to him but this."
— Saladin, first sultan of Egypt and Syria (4 March 1193)

"Youth, I forgive thee! Take off his chains, give him 100 shillings, and let him go."
— Richard I of England (6 April 1199), with reference to the young man who had mortally wounded him with a crossbow

"Under the feet of my friars."
— Saint Dominic, Castilian Catholic priest, founder of the Dominican Order, when asked where he wanted to be buried (6 August 1221)

"I have sinned against my brother, the ass."
— Francis of Assisi, Italian Catholic friar (3 October 1226)

"Let not my end disarm you, and on no account weep or keen for me, lest the enemy be warned of my death."
()
— Genghis Khan, warlord and khan of Mongolia (18 August 1227)

"I see my God. He calls me to Him."
— Anthony of Padua, Portuguese Catholic priest and Franciscan friar (13 June 1231)

"Don't cut my face."
()
— Skule Bårdsson, Norwegian nobleman (24 May 1240), before being killed by supporters of King Haakon IV of Norway

"By the arm of St. James, it is time to die."
— Simon de Montfort, 6th Earl of Leicester (4 August 1265), before dying at the Battle of Evesham

"O my mother! how deep will be thy sorrow at the news of this day!"
— Conradin, last direct heir of the House of Hohenstaufen (29 October 1268), prior to execution by beheading at the age of 16

"I will enter thy house. I will worship in Thy sanctuary."
— Louis IX of France (25 August 1270)

"I am on the way to Spires to visit the kings, my predecessors."
— Rudolf I of Germany (15 July 1291); he was buried at Speyer Cathedral

"Carry my bones before you on your march, for the rebels will not be able to endure the sight of me, alive or dead."
— Edward I of England (7 July 1307), to his son, Edward II of England, while dying during a war with Scotland

"Pope Clement, Chevalier Guillaume de Nogaret, King Philip! I summon you to the Tribunal of Heaven before the year is out!"
— Jacques de Molay, last Grand Master of the Knights Templar (11 or 18 March 1314), before being burned at the stake

"King of heaven, do thou have mercy on me, for the king of earth hath forsaken me."
— Thomas, 2nd Earl of Lancaster (22 March 1322), before beheading for treason against his cousin, Edward II of England

"I have not told half of what I saw."
()
— Marco Polo, Venetian traveller in Asia ( January 9, 1324), responding to skepticism about the content of his memoir, The Travels of Marco Polo

"I give thee thanks, O God, for all thy benefits, and with all the pains of my soul I humbly beseech thy mercy to give me remission of those sins I have wickedly committed against thee; and of all mortal men whom willingly or ignorantly I have offended, with all my heart I desire forgiveness."
— Edward the Black Prince, heir to the English throne (8 June 1376)

"Jesus."
— Edward III of England (21 June 1377), kissing a crucifix

"Ah, Jesus!"
— Charles V of France (16 September 1380)

"Because they are all under my command, they are sworn to do what I bid them."
— Wat Tyler, leader of the Peasants' Revolt (15 June 1381), prior to being killed by officers loyal to Richard II of England

"I am a dead man! Lord, have mercy upon me!"
— Gaston III, Count of Foix (1391)

15th century
"Never yet has death been frightened away by screaming."
— Timur, Turco-Mongol conqueror, founder of the Timurid Empire (17–19 February 1405)

"O, holy simplicity!"
()
— Jan Hus, Czech theologian and church reformer (6 July 1415). While being burned at the stake for heresy, he saw an old woman throw a small amount of brushwood onto the fire.

"O Lord God, Father Almighty, have mercy upon me, and be merciful unto mine offences, for thou knowest how sincerely I have loved Thy truth."
— Jerome of Prague, Czech scholastic philosopher and theologian (30 May 1416), burned for heresy

"Make my skin into drumheads for the Bohemian cause."
— Jan Žižka, Czech general (11 October 1424)

"I die content, after living the prescribed time, and leaving you, my sons, in affluence and health, placed in such a situation as, if you follow my example, will enable you to live honored and respected. I recall nothing in my life with so much pleasure as having given offence to no one, and having tried to serve all men as far as possible. I advise you to act thus, if you would live securely, accepting only those honors as the laws and favor of the state confer upon you; for it is the exercise of power that has been violently—not voluntarily—obtained, that occasions hatred and strife."
— Giovanni di Bicci de' Medici, Italian banker (February 1429)

"Hold the cross high so I may see it through the flames!"
— Joan of Arc, French military leader and mystic (30 May 1431), while she was burning at the stake

"Fie on life! Speak no more of it to me."
()
— Margaret Stewart, Dauphine of France (16 August 1445)

"O Gabriel, Gabriel, better would it have been for you to have been neither pope, nor cardinal, nor bishop, but to have finished your days as you commenced them, following peaceably in the monastery the exercises of your order."
— Pope Eugene IV (born Gabriele Condulmer) (23 February 1447)

"Will not all my riches save me? What, is there no bribing death?"
— Henry Beaufort (11 April 1447), Cardinal, Bishop of Winchester

"Were I born the son of a farmer, and became a friar of the Abrojo, and not the king of Castile."
""
— John II of Castile (22 July 1454), King of Castile

"I was born as a lily in the garden, and like the lily I grew, as my age advanced / I became old and had to die, and so I withered and died."
— Pachacuti ( 1471/1472), Sapa Inca and founder of the Inca Empire, poem composed on his deathbed

"Our Lady of Embrun, my good mistress, help me."
()
— Louis XI, King of France (30 August 1483)

"Treason! treason!"
— Richard III of England (22 August 1485), when deserted by his best troops at the Battle of Bosworth Field

"I know only Jesus the crucified."
— Wessel Gansfort, Dutch theologian and humanist (4 October 1489)

"I hope never again to commit a mortal sin, nor even a venial one, if I can help it."
— Charles VIII of France (7 April 1498)

"My Lord died innocent of all crimes, for my sins; and shall not I willingly give my soul for the love of Him."
— Girolamo Savonarola, Italian Dominican friar (23 May 1498), when asked before his execution if he was resigned to death

16th century
"I come. I come. It is right. Wait a moment."
()
— Pope Alexander VI (18 August 1503)

"Into Your hands, O Lord, I commend my spirit."
()
— Christopher Columbus, Italian explorer (20 May 1506), quoting Jesus

"I have taken care of everything in life, only not for death—and now I have to die completely unprepared."
— Cesare Borgia, Italian politician and condottiero (12 March 1507)

"We heartily desire our executors to consider how behoofful it is to be prayed for."
— Henry VII of England (21 April 1509)

"I believe."
— Georges d'Amboise, French Roman Catholic cardinal and minister of state (25 May 1510)

"That is false. I always have served my king loyally and sought to add to his domains."
— Vasco Núñez de Balboa, Spanish explorer, governor and conquistador (January 1519), on hearing a herald call him a "usurper of the rights of the Crown" while on the way to his execution by decapitation

"I have offended God and mankind because my work did not reach the quality it should have."
()
— Leonardo da Vinci, Italian artist and scientist (2 May 1519), to King Francis I of France

"Happy."
— Raphael, Italian artist (6 April 1520)

"I confide to your care my beloved children, the most precious jewels I can leave you. The great monarch beyond the ocean will interest himself to see that they come into their inheritance, if you present before him their just claims. I know your master will do this, if for no other reason, then for the kindness I have shown the Spaniards, though it has occasioned my ruin. For all my misfortunes, Malinche, I bear you no ill will."
— Moctezuma II, Huey Tlatoani or Emperor of the Aztec Empire (29 June 1520), to Hernán Cortés (calling him by the name of his interpreter, La Malinche)

"I have been murdered; no remedy can prevent my speedy death."
— Pope Leo X (1 December 1521), rumored to have died by poison

"I am curious to see what happens in the next world to one who dies unshriven."
— Pietro Perugino, Italian artist (1523), declining the last rites

"I have already confessed my sins to God."
— Franz von Sickingen, German knight and Protestant leader (7 May 1523), when his chaplain asked if he wanted to confess prior to his death defending his castle

"At least I may die facing the enemy."
— Pierre Terrail, seigneur de Bayard, French knight (30 April 1524), mortally wounded at the Battle of the Sesia (1524)

"I desire to go to hell, and not to heaven. In the former place I shall enjoy the company of popes, kings, and princes, while in the latter are only beggars, monks, hermits, and apostles."
— Niccolò Machiavelli (21 June 1527), Italian Renaissance diplomat, philosopher and writer

"How long, Lord, shall darkness cover this land? How long wilt thou suffer this tyranny of men? Lord Jesus, receive my spirit."
— Patrick Hamilton, Scottish churchman (29 February 1528), while being burned at the stake

"Master Kyngston, I pray you have me commended to his Grace, and beseech him, in my behalf, to call to mind all things that have passed between us, especially concerning good Queen Katharine and himself, and then shall his Grace's conscience know whether I have offended him or not. He is a prince of most royal courage, and rather than miss any part of his will, he will endanger one-half of his kingdom; and, I do assure you, I have often knelt before him, sometimes for three hours together, to persuade him from his appetite, and could not prevail.
"And, Master Kyngston, had I but served God as diligently as I have served the king, he would not have given me over in my gray hairs. But this is my just reward for my pains and study, not regarding my service to God, but only my duty to my Prince."
— Thomas Wolsey, English archbishop, statesman and cardinal (29 November 1530); to the Lieutenant of the Tower of London, after falling ill on the way to London under arrest for treason

"I give your brothers to your keeping. Be faithful to them and all the people."
— Babur, founder of the Mughal Empire and first Emperor of the Mughal dynasty (26 December 1530)

"I pray you, good people, be not the worse to these men on my account, as though they were the authors of my death."
— Thomas Bilney, English Christian martyr (19 August 1531). While he awaited burning for heresy, the friars and people present argued over who was responsible for Bilney's death; the friars threatened to withhold alms from the people if they were blamed

"Can this be considered a calamity? Well! they can, indeed, kill the body, but they are not able to kill the soul."
— Huldrych Zwingli, priest and leader of the Reformation in Switzerland (11 October 1531), mortally wounded at the Battle of Kappel

"O ye papists: behold, ye look for miracles, and here now ye may see a miracle, for in this fire I feel no more pain than if I were in a bed of down, but it is to me as sweet as a bed of roses."
— James Bainham, English lawyer and Protestant reformer (30 April 1532), while burning at the stake for heresy

"That is enough to last till I get to Heaven."
— William Warham, Archbishop of Canterbury (22 August 1532), when a servant told him he had thirty pounds left

"Father, into Thy hands I commend my spirit."
— Ludovica Albertoni, Italian noblewoman, professed member of the Third Order of Saint Francis (31 January 1533), quoting Jesus

"This is not my home."
— Ludovico Ariosto, Italian poet (6 July 1533)

"What have I done, or my children, that I should meet such a fate? And from your hands, too, you who have met with friendship and kindness from my people who have received nothing but benefits from my hands."
— Atahualpa, last Sapa Inca of the Inca Empire (26 July 1533), prior to execution by strangling

"Begone thou wretched beast, which hast utterly undone me."
()
— Heinrich Cornelius Agrippa, German polymath and occultist (18 February 1535), to his black dog (allegedly his familiar)

"I die the King's good servant, and God's first."
— Thomas More, Lord High Chancellor of Britain (6 July 1535), prior to beheading for treason

"Mine eyes desire thee only. Farewell."
()
— Catherine of Aragon, Queen of England (7 January 1536), closing her last letter to her former husband, Henry VIII of England

"Masters, I pray you pray for me, for I have deserved this death."
— Mark Smeaton, musician in the household of Queen Anne Boleyn (17 May 1536), prior to beheading for alleged treason and adultery

"Oh God, have pity on my soul. Oh God, have pity on my soul."
— Anne Boleyn, Queen of England (19 May 1536), prior to her execution by beheading

"Lord! Lord! make an end! make an end!"
()
— Erasmus, Dutch Catholic priest and humanist scholar (12 July 1536)

"Lord, open the King of England's eyes."
— William Tyndale, English scholar and Bible translator ( 6 October 1536), before being strangled and burned at the stake for heresy

"None but Christ! None but Christ!"
— John Lambert, English Protestant martyr (22 November 1538), while being burned at the stake

"May an avenger arise from my bones."
()
— Filippo Strozzi the Younger, Florentine banker (18 December 1538). He carved this line from Virgil's Aeneid on a mantelpiece with his sword as his suicide note.

"Death cannot destroy us, for it is destroyed already by Him for Whose sake we suffer."
— Jerome Russell, Franciscan friar (1539), burned for heresy in Scotland

"God be merciful to me, a sinner; Lord Jesus receive my spirit! Miserere mei Deus secundum magnam misericordiam tuam."
— Thomas Forret, vicar of Dollar, Clackmannanshire, burned for heresy (28 February/1 March 1539), quoting Psalm 51

"Did you envy my happiness?"
— Francisco de San Roman, Spanish merchant and Protestant martyr (1540). While burning at the stake, he moved his head in a way which caused the friars to believe he had recanted. Upon his removal from the flames, he asked them this question and was then returned to the fire.

"I die in the traditional faith."
— Thomas Cromwell, 1st Earl of Essex (28 July 1540), prior to beheading for treason and heresy

"I trust in no good works that ever I did, but only in the death of Christ. I do not doubt but through Him to inherit the kingdom of Heaven. But imagine not that I speak against good works, for they are to be done, and verily they that do them not shall never enter into the kingdom of God."
— Robert Barnes, English reformer and Protestant martyr (30 July 1540), while being burned at the stake for heresy

"Blessed are they who suffer persecution for righteousness' sake."
— Margaret Pole, Countess of Salisbury (27 May 1541), quoting Matthew 5:10 while an incompetent executioner attempted to behead her

"Jesu!"
— Francisco Pizarro, Spanish conquistador (26 June 1541), after being stabbed by assassins

"Luis de Moscoso."
— Hernando de Soto, Spanish explorer and conquistador (21 May 1542), naming his successor

"It [the Crown of Scotland] came with a lass, and it will go with a lass."
()
— James V of Scotland (15 December 1542), on being informed of the birth of his daughter and successor, Mary, Queen of Scots

"Now, O Lord, set thy servant free."
— Nicolaus Copernicus, mathematician and astronomer (24 May 1543), paraphrasing 

"We are beggars, this is true."
( )
— Martin Luther, German theologian who started the Protestant Reformation (18 February 1546)

"Lo! here is a token that I forgive thee; my heart, do thine office."
— George Wishart, Scottish Protestant reformer and martyr (1 March 1546), kissing one of his executioners on the cheek after the man asked for his forgiveness

"I am a priest; I am a priest! Fie! Fie! All is gone."
— David Beaton, Archbishop of St Andrews, final Scottish Cardinal prior to the Scottish Reformation (29 May 1546), during his assassination

"I came not hither to deny my Lord and Master."
— Anne Askew, English writer and poet (16 July 1546), when offered letter of pardon before being burned at the stake for heresy

"All is lost! Monks, monks, monks!"
— Henry VIII, King of England (28 January 1547)

"Farewell, and remember me."
— Margaret of Valois-Angoulême, Queen of Navarre (21 December 1549)

"Jesu, Maria!"
— George Martinuzzi, Archbishop of Esztergom (16 December 1551), while being assassinated

"Bring down the curtain, the farce is played out."
— François Rabelais, French writer and physician (1553)

"Lord take my spirit."
— Edward VI of England (6 July 1553)

"Jesus, Son of the eternal God, have mercy on me!"
— Michael Servetus, Spanish theologian, physician and humanist (27 October 1553), while being burned at the stake for heresy on a pyre of his own books

"Lord, into Thy hands I commend my spirit."
— Lady Jane Grey, de facto Queen of England and Ireland (12 February 1554), quoting Jesus prior to her beheading

"What I then said I unsay now; and what I now say is the truth."
— Thomas Wyatt the Younger, English politician and leader of Wyatt's rebellion (11 April 1554), exculpating Princess Elizabeth and Edward Courtenay, 1st Earl of Devon, prior to execution by beheading for treason

"Lord, receive my spirit."
— John Rogers, English clergyman, Bible translator and commentator (4 February 1555), prior to burning at the stake for heresy

"Welcome the cross of Christ! welcome everlasting life!"
— Laurence Saunders, English Protestant martyr (8 February 1555), kissing the stake at which he was to be burned

"If you love my soul, away with it!"
— John Hooper, Anglican Bishop of Gloucester and Worcester, Protestant martyr (9 February 1555), refusing a pardon prior to burning at the stake for heresy

"Merciful Father of heaven, for Jesus Christ my Savior's sake, receive my soul into Thy hand."
— Rowland Taylor, English Protestant martyr (9 February 1555), while being burned at the stake for heresy

"I am not afraid. Lord, Lord, Lord, receive my spirit!"
— William Hunter, English silk-weaver and Protestant martyr (27 March 1555), while being burned at the stake for heresy

"Be of good comfort, brother, for we shall have a merry supper with the Lord this night: if there be any way to heaven on horseback or in fiery chariots, this is it."
— John Bradford, English Reformer and Protestant martyr (1 July 1555), to John Leaf, a fellow martyr, prior to being burned at the stake

"Let the flames come near me. I cannot burn! I cannot burn!"
— Nicholas Ridley,  (16 October 1555). While burning at the stake for heresy, only his lower limbs burned away.

"Be of good comfort, Master Ridley, and play the man; we shall this day light such a candle by God's grace in England as (I trust) shall never be put out."
— Hugh Latimer, former Bishop of Worcester (16 October 1555); to Nicholas Ridley while they were burning at the stake for heresy

"Like Peter, I have erred, unlike Peter, I have not wept."
()
— Stephen Gardiner, English bishop and politician (12 November 1555)

"Lord Jesus, receive my spirit... I see the heavens open and Jesus standing at the right hand of God."
— Thomas Cranmer, Archbishop of Canterbury (21 March 1556), alluding to  prior to execution by burning

"Now I'm oiled. Keep me from the rats."
— Pietro Aretino, Italian writer and blackmailer (21 October 1556), after receiving the last rites

"Lord Jesu!"
— Albert Alcibiades, Margrave of Brandenburg-Kulmbach (8 January 1557)

"Lord, have mercy upon me! Pray, people, while there is time."
— Walter Milne, last Protestant martyr burned in Scotland before the Scottish Reformation (28 April 1558)

"Now, Lord, I go! Ay, Jesus!"
— Charles V, Holy Roman Emperor (21 September 1558), looking at a crucifix

"After I am dead, you will find Calais written upon my heart."
— Mary I of England (17 November 1558). French forces had captured Calais from England earlier that year.

"Nothing else but heaven."
— Philip Melanchthon, German Lutheran reformer (19 April 1560), when asked if he wanted anything

"Farewell, thou who art so beautiful and so cruel; who killest me and whom I cannot cease to love."
()
— Pierre de Bocosel de Chastelard, French poet (22 February 1563), addressing the window of Holyrood Palace before being hanged for hiding under the bed of Mary, Queen of Scots

"I'm still learning."
()
— Michelangelo, Italian artist and poet (18 February 1564)

"Thou, Lord, bruisest me; but I am abundantly satisfied, since it is from thy hand."
— John Calvin, French theologian and Protestant reformer, principal developer of Calvinism (27 May 1564)

"Tomorrow, at sunrise, I shall no longer be here."
()
— Nostradamus, French seer (2 July 1566), correctly predicting his death

"I desire to die and be with Christ."
— Roger Ascham, English scholar and didactic writer (30 December 1568)

"Victory! Victory!"
()
— Bartolomeo Bartocci, Italian trader (25 May 1569), while burning at the stake for heresy

"I am he; respect my gray hairs, young man!"
— Gaspard II de Coligny, Admiral of France (24 August 1572), in response to one of his assassins asking, "Art thou Coligny?"

"Now it is come."
— John Knox, founder of the Presbyterian Church of Scotland (24 November 1572)

"Nurse, nurse, what murder! what blood! Oh! I have done wrong. God pardon me!"
— Charles IX of France (30 May 1574)

"Royal freedom will only be lost with life"
()
— Sebastian of Portugal (4 August 1578), when being advised to surrender, and to hand over his sword to the victors of the Battle of Alcácer Quibir

"It matters little to me; for if I am but once dead they may bury me or not bury me as they please. They may leave my corpse to rot where I die if they wish."
— George Buchanan, Scottish historian and humanist scholar (28 September 1582), when his servant asked who would pay for his burial after Buchanan told him to distribute his property among the poor

"Over my spirit flash and float in divine radiancy the bright and glorious visions of the world to which I go."
— Teresa of Ávila, Spanish Carmelite nun, mystic and author (4 or 15 October 1582); last words uncertain

"Too late."
— Fernando Álvarez de Toledo, 3rd Duke of Alba (11 December 1582), on learning that the King was to visit him

"We are as neare to Heaven by sea as by land."
— Humphrey Gilbert, English adventurer and explorer (9 September 1583), prior to sinking of HMS Squirrel with all hands

"God have mercy upon me, and upon this poor nation."
()
— William the Silent, Prince of Orange (10 July 1584), assassinated by Balthasar Gérard

"Jesus! I pardon you."
— Vittoria Accoramboni, Italian noblewoman (22 December 1585), kneeling before a crucifix

"The murder of the Queen had been represented to me as a deed lawful and meritorious. I die a firm Catholic."
— Anthony Babington, English gentleman, conspirator in the Babington Plot (20 September 1586), prior to being hanged, drawn and quartered for high treason

"Take it; thy need is greater than mine."
— Philip Sidney, English poet and soldier (17 October 1586), mortally wounded at the Battle of Zutphen, passing a cup of water to another wounded soldier

"O Lord, into Thy hands I commend my spirit."
()
— Mary, Queen of Scots (8 February 1587), quoting Jesus prior to execution by beheading

"Let the pulse beat as it may, we know the mercy of God will never fail."
— Frederick II of Denmark (4 April 1588)

" [Far from me to glory except in the cross of Jesus Christ]. Good people, I beseech God to send all felicity."
— George Beesley, English Roman Catholic priest and martyr (2 July 1591), prior to execution

"It is time for Matins."
— John of the Cross, Spanish Catholic priest and mystic (14 December 1591), dying at the stroke of midnight

"A bishop ought to die on his legs."
— John Woolton, Bishop of Exeter (13 March 1594)

"Lord, into Thy hands I commend my spirit."
— Torquato Tasso, Italian poet (25 April 1595), quoting Jesus

"Life or death is welcome to me; and I desire not to live, but so far as I may be serviceable to God and His church."
— William Whitaker, Calvinistic Anglican churchman, academic and theologian (4 December 1595)

"Do not announce my death."
()
— Yi Sun-sin, Korean naval commander (16 December 1598), telling his nephew to hide his death by gunshot from his soldiers to avoid demoralizing them during the Battle of Noryang

"I die a martyr and willingly — my soul shall mount up to heaven in this chariot of smoke."
— Giordano Bruno, Italian Dominican friar (17 February 1600), prior to burning at the stake for heresy

"Good Doctor, God hath heard my daily petitions, for I am at peace with all men, and He is at peace with me; and from that blessed assurance I feel that inward joy which this world can neither give nor take from me: my conscience beareth me this witness, and this witness makes the thoughts of death joyful. I could wish to live to do the Church more service, but cannot hope it, for my days are passed as a shadow that returns not."
— Richard Hooker, English priest and theologian (3 November 1600)

17th century
"May I not seem to have lived in vain."
()
— Tycho Brahe, Danish astronomer (24 October 1601), to his assistant Johannes Kepler

"All my possessions for a moment of time."
— Elizabeth I, queen regnant of England (24 March 1603)

"I cannot bear that any misunderstanding should subsist between you and those who have for so many years shared in my toils and been the companions of my glory."
— Akbar, third Mughal emperor (27 October 1605), to his nobles and his son, Jahangir; he then asked their forgiveness if he had ever wronged them

"Stand by me, Tom, and we will die together."
— Robert Catesby, leader of the Gunpowder Plot (8 November 1605). Catesby and Thomas Percy were shot by armed men led by Sir Richard Walsh.

"Now I am going."
— Paolo Farinati, Italian Mannerist painter (1606), on his deathbed. His wife replied, "I will bear you company, my dear husband," and also died.

"I begin to perceive and feel the joys of eternal life. I shall soon behold Him, who was sacrificed for men; I long for the blessed sight. All else is to me as dross: there is nothing that could make me wish to live one hour longer."
— Joseph Justus Scaliger, French Calvinist religious leader and scholar (21 January 1609)

"I am wounded."
— Henry IV of France (14 May 1610), while being assassinated by stabbing

"I receive absolution upon this condition."
— François Ravaillac, French Catholic zealot, assassin of Henry IV of France (27 May 1610), receiving conditional absolution prior to his execution due to his insistence that he had no accomplices

"Ease and pleasure quake to hear of death; but my life, full of cares and miseries, desireth to be dissolved."
— Robert Cecil, 1st Earl of Salisbury, English statesman (24 May 1612)

"I would say 'somewhat,' but I cannot utter it."
— Henry Frederick, Prince of Wales (6 November 1612), when asked if he was in pain

"If there be here any hidden Catholics, let them pray for me, but the prayers of heretics I will not have."
— John Ogilvie  (10 March 1615), hanged, drawn and quartered at Glasgow Cross because of having preached the Catholic religion, then illegal in Scotland, and for refusing to pledge allegiance to King James VI of Scotland.

"I am Sanada Nobushige, no doubt an adversary quite worthy of you, but I am exhausted and can fight no longer. Go on, take my head as your trophy."
— Sanada Yukimura, Japanese samurai warrior (3 June 1615), to his foes prior to his death at the Battle of Tennōji

"Already my foot is in the stirrup."
— Miguel de Cervantes, Spanish novelist (22 April 1616)

"Come Lord Jesu, come quickly, finish in me the work that Thou has begun; into Thy hands, O Lord, I commend my spirit, for Thou has redeemed me. O God of truth, save me Thy servant, who hopes and confides in Thee alone; let Thy mercy, O Lord, be shewn unto me; in Thee have I trusted, O Lord, let me not be confounded for ever."
— Robert Abbot, Anglican clergyman and academic (2 March 1617)

"What dost thou fear? Strike, man, strike!"
— Walter Raleigh, English poet, soldier and courtier (29 October 1618), as he lay ready to be beheaded in the Old Palace Yard at the Palace of Westminster

"They sweat in extremes, for fear of the unwarlike; I am dying undisturbed"
()
— Lucilio Vanini, Italian philosopher, physician and freethinker (9 February 1619), prior to execution by strangling and burning for atheism and blasphemy

"Make it short. Make it short."
()
— Johan van Oldenbarnevelt, Dutch statesman (13 May 1619), to his executioner

"Oh, would to God I had never reigned! Oh, that those years I have spent in my kingdom I had lived a solitary life in the wilderness! Oh, that I had lived alone with God! How much more secure should I now have died! With how much more confidence should I have gone to the throne of God! What doth all my glory profit, but that I have so much the more torment in my death?"
— Philip III of Spain (31 March 1621)

"Now I have overcome."
— Johann Arndt, German Lutheran theologian (11 May 1621), to his wife

"Jesus, Jesus, Jesus."
— Robert Bellarmine, Italian Jesuit and Roman Catholic cardinal (17 September 1621)

"All my life I have carried myself gracefully."
— Rodrigo Calderón, Count of Oliva (21 October 1621), when his confessor chastised him for his attention to his appearance prior to his execution by beheading

"Be thou everlasting."
— Paolo Sarpi, Venetian historian, prelate, scientist, canon lawyer and statesman (15 January 1623), referring to Venice

"Thy creatures, O Lord, have been my books, but Thy Holy Scriptures much more. I have sought Thee in the fields and gardens, but I have found Thee, O God, in Thy Sanctuary—Thy Temple."
— Francis Bacon, English philosopher and statesman (9 April 1626)

"Blessed be God, though I change my place, I shall not change my company; for I have walked with God while living, and now I go to rest with God."
— John Preston, Anglican minister, master of Emmanuel College, Cambridge (20 July 1628)

"Villaine!"
— George Villiers, 1st Duke of Buckingham (23 August 1628); to his assassin, John Felton, after being stabbed by him

"Hold your tongue; your wretched style only makes me out of conceit with them."
— François de Malherbe, French poet, critic and translator (16 October 1628), listening on his deathbed to his confessor describing the glories of heaven

"I am the man."
— John Felton, assassin of George Villiers, 1st Duke of Buckingham (29 November 1628), referring to the killing of Buckingham

"I do bless.—May Jesus and Mary bless, rule and govern."
— Pierre de Bérulle, French Roman Catholic cardinal and statesman (2 October 1629), blessing his congregation while celebrating Mass

"It comes at last, the happy day: Let thanks be given to God in heaven, while we learn pleasure in His way."
— Agrippa d'Aubigné, French poet, soldier, propagandist and chronicler (29 April 1630)

"I were miserable, if I might not die."
— John Donne, English poet, scholar and soldier, Dean of St Paul's (31 March 1631)

"Now, God be with you, my dear children; I have breakfasted with you, and shall sup with my Lord Jesus Christ this night."
— Robert Bruce of Kinnaird, Moderator of the General Assembly of the Church of Scotland (27 July 1631)

"I have enough, brother; try to save your own life."
— Gustavus Adolphus of Sweden (16 November 1632), mortally wounded at the Battle of Lützen (1632)

"I am now ready to die. Lord, forsake me not, now my strength faileth me; but grant me mercy for the merits of my Jesus. And now Lord—Lord, now receive my soul."
— George Herbert, Welsh-born poet, orator, and priest of the Church of England (1 March 1633)

"Thy kingdom come, thy will be done."
— Edward Coke, English barrister, judge and politician (3 September 1634)

"All right then, I'll say it. Dante makes me sick."
— Lope de Vega, Spanish playwright (27 August 1635)

"I have kept the faith once given to the saints; for the which cause I have also suffered these things; but I am not ashamed, for I know whom I have believed, and I am persuaded that He is able to keep that which I have committed to Him against that day."
— William Bedell, Anglican Lord Bishop of Kilmore (7 February 1642), dying from exposure after being imprisoned and tortured by rebels
"Absolutely, and I pray God to condemn me, if I have had any other aim than the welfare of God and the state."
— Cardinal Richelieu, French clergyman and statesman (4 December 1642), when asked whether he pardoned his enemies

"O Lord, save my country! O Lord, be merciful to—"
— John Hampden, English landowner and politician (24 June 1643), mortally wounded at the Battle of Chalgrove Field six days before his death

"I, feeble and of small virtue, have offended against Heaven; the rebels have seized my capital because my ministers deceived me. Ashamed to face my ancestors, I die. Removing my imperial cap and with my hair disheveled about my face, I leave to the rebels the dismemberment of my body. Let them not harm my people!"
()
— Chongzhen Emperor, the last emperor of Ming Dynasty (24 April 1644)

"Lord, receive my soul."
— William Laud, Archbishop of Canterbury (10 January 1645), spoken as the signal to the executioner at his beheading for treason

"Be serious."
— Hugo Grotius, Dutch humanist, diplomat, lawyer, theologian and writer (28 August 1645)

"Ungrateful traitors!"
— Masaniello, Italian fisherman and revolutionary leader (16 July 1647), to his assassins

"Ay! but I have been nearer to you, my friends, many a time, and you have missed me."
— George Lisle, Royalist leader in the English Civil War (28 August 1648), when the officer in charge of his firing squad said they would hit him

"Stay for the sign."
— Charles I of England (30 January 1649), asking for his executioner to await his signal before beheading him

"The covenant which I took, I own it and adhere to it. Bishops, I do not care for them. I never intended to advance their interests."
— James Graham, 1st Marquess of Montrose (21 May 1650), prior to execution by hanging, beheading and quartering

"Lord Jesus, receive me!"
— Eusebius Andrews, English royalist (22 August 1650), prior to execution by beheading for treason

"How sweet it is to rest!"
— John Taylor, English poet (December 1653)

"You see what is man's life."
— Pierre Gassendi, French philosopher, Catholic priest, astronomer and mathematician (24 October 1655)

"O Lord, forgive me specially my sins of omission."
— James Ussher, Church of Ireland Archbishop of Armagh and Primate of All Ireland (21 March 1656)

"It is not my design to drink or to sleep, but my design is to make what haste I can to be gone."
— Oliver Cromwell, English general and statesman, Lord Protector (3 September 1658)

"Ah! mes enfans, you cannot cry as much for me as I have made you laugh in my time! I never thought that it was so easy a matter to laugh at the approach of death."
— Paul Scarron, French poet, dramatist and novelist (6 October 1660)

"O, my poor soul, what is to become of thee? Whither wilt thou go?"
— Cardinal Mazarin, Italian cardinal, diplomat and politician (9 March 1661)

"I bless the Lord that he gave me counsel."
— Samuel Rutherford, Scottish pastor (29 March 1661)

"I die not only a Protestant, but with a heart-hatred of popery, prelacy, and all superstition. Lord Jesus, receive me into Thy glory."
— Archibald Campbell, 1st Marquess of Argyll, Scottish nobleman (27 May 1661), before execution by beheading

"I take God to record upon my soul that I would not exchange this scaffold with the palace or mitre of the greatest prelate in Britain. The covenants, the covenants shall yet be Scotland's reviving."
— James Guthrie, Scottish Presbyterian minister (1 June 1661), prior to execution by hanging for high treason

"Jesus, oh Jesus, you are my God, my justice, my strength, my all."
— Marie Angélique Arnauld, Abbess of the Abbey of Port-Royal (6 August 1661)

"It is a bad cause which cannot bear the words of a dying man."
— Henry Vane the Younger, English politician, statesman and colonial governor (14 June 1662), prior to execution by beheading for treason

"My God, forsake me not."
— Blaise Pascal, French mathematician, physicist and theologian (19 August 1662)

"My heart is fixed, O God! my heart is fixed where true joy is to be found."
— Robert Sanderson, English theologian and casuist (29 January 1663)

"Abba, Father, accept this, Thy poor sinful servant, coming unto Thee through the merits of Jesus Christ. O pray, pray! praise, praise!"
— Archibald Johnston, Scottish judge and statesman (22 July 1663), before execution by hanging

"Monsieur de Montaigu, consider what I owe to God, the favor He has shown me, and the great indulgence for which I am beholden to Him. Observe how they are swelled; time to depart."
— Anne of Austria, former Queen of France (20 January 1666), looking at her formerly beautiful hands

"And now I begin my intercourse with God, which shall never be broken off. Farewell, father and mother, friends and relations; farewell, the world and all delights; farewell, sun, moon and stars! Welcome, God and Father; welcome, sweet Jesus Christ, the mediator of the new covenant; welcome, blessed Spirit of grace, the God of all consolation; welcome, glory; welcome, eternal life; and welcome, death."
— Hugh Mackail, Scottish martyr (22 December 1666), prior to execution by hanging

"My trust is in God."
— Jeremy Taylor, Anglican divine (13 August 1667)

"Vex me not with this thing, but give me a simple cross, that I may adore it, both as it is in itself and as I can figure it in my mind."
— Alonso Cano, Spanish painter, architect and sculptor (3 September 1667), asking a priest to take away a badly carved crucifix

"I shall have to ask leave to desist, when I am interrupted by so great an experiment as dying."
— William Davenant, English poet and playwright (7 April 1668), setting aside the manuscript of a new poem

"Far from well, yet far better than mine iniquities deserve."
— Richard Mather, Puritan minister (22 April 1669), when asked about his health

"Lord!"
— John Cosin, English churchman (15 January 1672), raising his hand

"Well, my friend, what news from the Great Mogul?"
— François de La Mothe Le Vayer, French writer (9 May 1672), to physician and traveler François Bernier, who had come to say goodbye to him

"Bad, bad! To judge by what I now endure, the hand of death grasps me sharply."
— Salvator Rosa, Italian artist and poet (15 March 1673), when asked how he was

"Death is the great key that opens the palace of Eternity."
— John Milton, English poet and intellectual (8 November 1674)

"I did not mean to be killed today."
()
— Henri de La Tour d'Auvergne, Viscount of Turenne (27 July 1675), struck by a cannonball at the Battle of Salzbach

"I would never have married had I known that my time would be so brief. If I had known that, I would not have taken upon myself double tears."
— Alexis of Russia, Russian Tsar

"I have seen the glories of the world."
— Isaac Barrow, English Christian theologian and mathematician (4 May 1677)

"Well, ladies, if I were one hour in heaven, I would not be again with you, as much as I love you."
— Mary Rich, Countess of Warwick (12 April 1678)

"How beautiful!"
— Giovan Battista Nani, Venetian ambassador, librarian and historian (5 November 1678)

"I shall be happy."
— James Sharp, Archbishop of St Andrews (3 May 1679)

"Now I am about to take my last voyage, a great leap in the dark."
— Thomas Hobbes, English philosopher (4 December 1679)

"The only objection against the Bible is a bad life."
— John Wilmot, 2nd Earl of Rochester, English poet and courtier (26 July 1680)

"I do not fear death."
— Thomas Blood, Anglo-Irish officer and desperado (24 August 1680)

"I do forgive you."
— William Howard, 1st Viscount Stafford (29 December 1680), to his executioner prior to beheading for alleged treason

"Now the bitterness of death is past."
— William Russell, Lord Russell (21 July 1683), after bidding farewell to his wife prior to execution by beheading for treason

"Stop. Change that to say, 'I am yet in the land of the dying, but I hope soon to be in the land of the living.'"
— John Owen, English Nonconformist church leader and theologian (24 August 1683), when his secretary had written "I am still in the land of the living" in a letter in his name

"I know that my Redeemer liveth. I die for the good old cause."
— Algernon Sidney, English politician (7 December 1683), prior to execution by beheading for treason

"My God, my Father, and my Friend, / Do not forsake me in the end."
— Wentworth Dillon, 4th Earl of Roscommon, Anglo-Irish landlord, Irish peer, and poet (18 January 1685), quoting from his own translation of the "Dies irae"

"I have been a most unconscionable time dying, but I beg you to excuse it."
— Charles II of England (6 February 1685)

"There are six guineas for you, and do not hack me as you did my Lord Russell. I have heard that you struck him three or four times. My servant will give you more gold if you do your work well."
— James Scott, 1st Duke of Monmouth, illegitimate son of Charles II of England (15 July 1685), to Jack Ketch, his executioner. Ketch was nervous and took several blows to behead Scott.

"Lord, into Thy hands I commend my spirit; for Thou hast redeemed me, Lord God of truth."
— James Renwick, Scottish minister (17 February 1688), before execution by hanging

"Take me, for I come to Thee."
— John Bunyan, English writer and preacher (31 August 1688)

"O, come in glory! I have long waited for Thy coming. Let no dark cloud rest on the work of the Indians. Let it live when I am dead. Welcome joy!"
— John Eliot, Puritan missionary to the American Indians, founder of Roxbury Latin School (21 May 1690)

"I need nothing but God, and to lose myself in the heart of Jesus."
— Margaret Mary Alacoque, French Roman Catholic nun, promoter of devotion to the Sacred Heart of Jesus (17 October 1690)

"Never heed; the Lord's power is over all weakness and death."
— George Fox, English Dissenter, founder of the Religious Society of Friends (13 January 1691)

"I know that it will be well with me."
— John Flavel, English Presbyterian clergyman and author (26 June 1691)

"Death, death. O I thank Him, I thank Him. The Lord teach you to die."
— Richard Baxter, English Puritan church leader, poet, hymnodist and theologian (8 December 1691)

— Louise-Anastasia Serment, French natural philosopher and poet (1692); lines addressed to Death

"You are a lyer; I am no more a Witch than you are a Wizard, and if you take away my Life, God will give you Blood to drink."
— Sarah Good, American woman accused of witchcraft during the Salem witch trials, to Reverend Nicholas Noyes prior to execution by hanging

"More weight."
— Giles Corey, English-born American farmer (19 September 1692), before being pressed to death during the Salem witch trials

"Oh, that this were for Ireland."
— Patrick Sarsfield, 1st Earl of Lucan, Irish soldier (21 August 1693), mortally wounded at the Battle of Landen

"My Lord, why do you not go on? I am not afraid to die."
— Mary II of England (28 December 1694), when the clergyman reading the prayers for the sick paused due to being overcome by grief

"O death, where is thy—"
— Philip Henry, English Nonconformist clergyman and diarist (24 June 1696), quoting 1 Corinthians 15:55

"Debt!"
— Hortense Mancini, Duchesse de Mazarin, niece of Cardinal Mazarin and mistress of Charles II of England (2 July 1699), dying in financial ruin

"I am nothing."
— Charles II of Spain (1 November 1700)

18th century

19th century

20th century

21st century

Ironic last words

"Let no one weep for me, or celebrate my funeral with mourning; for I still live, as I pass to and fro through the mouths of men."
— Ennius, writer and poet of the Roman Republic ( 169 BCE); lines dictated to be engraved on his memorial. Only fragments of his works now survive.

"Let all brave Prussians follow me!"
— Field Marshal Kurt Christoph Graf von Schwerin (6 May 1757), at the Battle of Prague, immediately before being struck by a cannonball.

 "Thomas Jefferson survives."
 — John Adams, president of the United States (4 July 1826), unaware that Jefferson had died earlier that same day

"They couldn't hit an elephant at this distance. [...] All right, my man; go to your place."
— General John Sedgwick (9 May 1864) at the Battle of Spotsylvania Court House shortly before being shot in the eye.

"Sergeant, the Spanish bullet isn't made that will kill me."
— Captain Buckey O'Neill (1 July 1898), one of Theodore Roosevelt's Rough Riders, just before being shot in the mouth prior to charge up Kettle Hill.

"I think I'm going to make it."
— Richard A. Loeb (28 January 1936), after being slashed 56 times with a razor in a prison fight.

"I'll show you that it won't shoot."
— Johnny Ace (25 December 1954), American musician, playing with a .32 caliber revolver.

"What do you think I'm gonna do? Blow my brains out?"
— Terry Kath (23 January 1978), of the band Chicago, just before putting a supposedly unloaded semi-automatic 9-mm pistol to his temple and pulling the trigger.

"I've got to be crazy to do this shot. I should've asked for a double."
— Vic Morrow, American actor (23 July 1982), prior to being killed along with two child actors during filming in the Twilight Zone accident

"I told u I was hardcore [...] u are so fucking stupid"
— Brandon Vedas (12 January 2003), American computer enthusiast talking on IRC during a drug overdose

"You're a lifesaver, Andy."
— William Donaldson, British satirist and playboy (22 June 2005), to the caretaker of his building, who had collected pills for him

Independently notable last words 
This section is for last words that pass Wikipedia's notability guidelines and have therefore warranted their own article.

"Do not disturb my circles!"
()
— Archimedes, Greek mathematician ( 212 BCE), to a Roman soldier who interrupted his geometric experiments during the capture of Syracuse, whereupon the soldier killed him
"You too, my child?"
()
— Julius Caesar, Roman dictator (15 March 44 BCE), discovering that his stepson Brutus was among his murderers

"It is finished."
()
— Jesus, founder of Christianity ( 30 CE), right before his death by crucifixion
 "Death to fascism! Freedom to the people!"

 — Stjepan Filipović, Yugoslav communist (22 May 1942), seconds before execution by hanging
 "I can't breathe. I can't breathe. I can't breathe. I can't breathe. I can't breathe. I can't breathe. I can't breathe. I can't breathe. I can't breathe. I can't breathe. I can't breathe."
 — Eric Garner, American former horticulturist (17 July 2014), after being put in a chokehold by an arresting NYPD officer

See also
Last words, about the actual final utterings of dying patients
Last words of Julius Caesar
Last Words of Christ
Gallows humor
List of unusual deaths
Death poem
Last meal

Notes

References

Further reading

External links

Death-related lists

Quotations